Ponticaulis profundi is a Gram-negative, strictly aerobic, rod-shaped and motile bacterium from the genus of Ponticaulis which has been isolated from a seamount near the Yap Trench.

References 

Caulobacterales
Bacteria described in 2018